Cheng Yaodong (born June 6, 1967 in Shanghai) is a Chinese football manager and a former international football player. 

As a player, he won the Chinese league and Cup with Shanghai Shenhua before ending his career with Shanghai COSCO Huili. After retiring, he would immediately go into management with Shanghai COSCO Huili who he coached for seven seasons before joining Chinese League Two club Shanghai Zobon followed by Shanghai Shenxin.

Playing career

Club career
Cheng Yaodong started his football career with Shanghai in 1987 when they were originally a semi-professional football team. Predominantly used as a defender he would gradually establish himself within the Shanghai team for several seasons and would also see Shanghai become a professional football team in 1994 when they renamed themselves as Shanghai Shenhua. In the 1995 league season Cheng Yaodong would help Shanghai win the second fully professional league title. His loyalty to Shanghai would see him named as their captain by the 1998 league season and would win the 1998 Chinese FA Cup, however despite playing for Shenhua through the majority of his football career Cheng could not win more honours with the club. Nearing the end of his football career he would play for second-tier team Shanghai COSCO Huili and help them win the division title and promotion to the top tier in the 2001 league season.

International career
Cheng Yaodong's greatest international achievement came when he would be called into the Chinese squad to play in the 1992 AFC Asian Cup, which saw China come third in the tournament. Though he was squad player throughout his international career he did play in the tournament against Japan on November 6, 1992 in a 3-2 defeat.

Management career
Nearing the end of his football career Cheng Yaodong was offered the chance to manage Shanghai COSCO Huili during the 2003 league season where he replaced Claude Le Roy and surprised many when he was able to steer them second in the league in his debut season and only one point off from the league title. The following season would see the club finish third within the league, however despite this the club could not continue to financially compete with local rivals Shanghai Shenhua and by the 2006 league season the club would move to Xi'an, Shaanxi and eventually change their name to Shaanxi Chanba. While Cheng would move with the club he was unable to replicate the same success he initially had and with the club being prudent in their spending he was only able to guide the club into mid-table positions for the next several seasons. This was halted for a short time when he guided the club to fifth in the 2008 league season, however on 28 August 2009, he surprisingly resigned after a 1-0 away win against the past Shanghai derby rivals Shanghai Shenhua, citing health problem and desire of studying abroad as reasons. While many among the public and media believed that due to his ties towards Shenhua, Cheng was seeking the possibility of replacing their coach Jia Xiuquan, however Shenhua decided to go with the experienced manager Miroslav Blažević and Cheng would return to Shanghai with third-tier club Shanghai Zobon at the beginning of the 2011 league season.

Honours

Player
Shanghai Shenhua
Chinese Jia-A League: 1995
Chinese FA Cup: 1991, 1998
Shanghai COSCO Huili
Chinese Jia-B League: 2001

Manager
Chinese Jia-A League: 2003 (2nd Place)

References

External links
 Biography at Sina.com (Chinese)
 

1967 births
Living people
Chinese footballers
Footballers from Shanghai
Chinese football managers
China international footballers
Shanghai Shenhua F.C. players
Beijing Renhe F.C. players
1992 AFC Asian Cup players
Beijing Renhe F.C. managers
Shanghai Shenxin F.C. managers
Chinese Super League managers
Association football defenders
Shanghai Port F.C. non-playing staff